The Slovakia national under-17 football team, controlled by the Slovak Football Association, is Slovakia's national under-17 football team and is considered to be a feeder team for the Slovakia U18 team.

Competition history

FIFA U-17 World Cup

Championship record

UEFA European Under-17 Championship

Championship record

Fixtures and results

Current squad 
 The following players were called up for the 2023 UEFA European Under-17 Championship qualification matches.
 Match dates: 19–25 October 2022
 Opposition: ,  and 
Caps and goals correct as of: 15 September 2022, after the match against

See also
Slovakia national football team
Slovakia national under-21 football team
Slovakia national under-19 football team
Slovakia national under-18 football team
Slovakia national under-16 football team
Slovakia national under-15 football team

References

External links
 Slovak Football Association 
  

European national under-17 association football teams
under-17